Michele Gordini (23 April 1896 – 22 February 1970) was an Italian racing cyclist. He rode in the 1925 Tour de France.

References

External links
 

1896 births
1970 deaths
Italian male cyclists
Place of birth missing
Sportspeople from the Province of Ravenna
Cyclists from Emilia-Romagna